The 2023 ARCA Menards Series West is the 70th season of the ARCA Menards Series West, a regional stock car racing series sanctioned by NASCAR in the United States. The season began on March 10 at Phoenix Raceway with the General Tire 150 and will end with the Desert Diamond Casino West Valley 100, also at Phoenix Raceway, on November 3.

Tyler Reif is the current points leader.

Jake Drew entered the season as the defending champion. He did not return to the West Series full-time in 2023 and defend his title after the team that he drove for in 2022, Sunrise Ford Racing, closed down after the end of the season and he was unable to find a full-time ride with another team at the start of the 2023 season.

Teams and drivers

Confirmed full-time teams

Confirmed part-time teams/drivers

Silly season news and updates

Confirmed changes

Teams
 On November 4, 2022, Sunrise Ford Racing team owner Bob Bruncati revealed during Jake Drew's championship celebration at Phoenix that he would be closing down his team in the West Series and would focus on competing in local short track racing. In addition to Drew's 2022 championship, SFR won the 2009 championship with Jason Bowles and the 2013 and 2018 championships with Derek Thorn.
 On December 9, 2022, it was announced that the No. 18 car would go back to being owned by Joe Gibbs Racing in 2023. It was owned by Kyle Busch Motorsports in 2022.

Potential and rumored changes
 On April 14, 2022, Todd Souza stated in an interview for the ARCA website that he might only run part-time in the West Series in 2023 in a new second car for his own team with someone else replacing him in his No. 13 car full-time.

Schedule
The full schedule was announced on November 22. Some race dates were announced before then. There are twelve races on the 2023 schedule, up from eleven in 2022.

Note: The race at Phoenix in March is a combination race with the ARCA Menards Series (highlighted in gold).

Schedule changes
 Portland International Raceway only has one West Series race in 2023 after having two in 2022. The race at Portland on Labor Day weekend was removed.
 Shasta Speedway (in northern California) and Madera Speedway (near Fresno, California) are both added to the schedule.

Broadcasting
Fox will again broadcast the combination race at Phoenix in March. The TV coverage for the rest of the schedule has yet to be announced.

Results and standings

Race results

Drivers' championship

Notes:
 The pole winner also receives 1 bonus point, similar to the previous ARCA points system used until 2019 and unlike NASCAR. 
 Additionally, after groups of 5 races of the season, drivers that compete in all 5 races receive 50 additional points. These points bonuses will be given after the races at Sonoma and the Las Vegas Bullring.

(key) Bold – Pole position awarded by time. Italics – Pole position set by final practice results or rainout. * – Most laps led. ** – All laps led.

See also
 2023 NASCAR Cup Series
 2023 NASCAR Xfinity Series
 2023 NASCAR Craftsman Truck Series
 2023 ARCA Menards Series
 2023 ARCA Menards Series East
 2023 NASCAR Pinty's Series
 2023 NASCAR Whelen Euro Series
 2023 SRX Series

Notes

References

ARCA Menards Series West
ARCA Menards Series West
ARCA Menards Series West
ARCA Menards Series West